The 2012 Finnish Figure Skating Championships took place between December 16 and 18, 2011 at the Tampereen Jäähalli in Tampere. Skaters competed in the disciplines of men's singles, ladies' singles, and ice dancing on the senior and junior levels. The results were one of the criteria used to choose the Finnish teams to the 2012 World Championships, 2012 European Championships, and 2012 World Junior Championships.

Senior results

Men

Ladies

Ice dance

External links
 Official site
 2012 Finnish Championships results

Finnish Figure Skating Championships
Finnish Figure Skating Championships, 2012
2011 in figure skating
2011 in Finnish sport
Finnish Figure Skating Championships, 2012